The women's 800 metres event  at the 1978 European Athletics Indoor Championships was held on 11 and 12 March in Milan.

Medalists

Results

Heats
First 2 from each heat (Q) qualified directly for the final.

Final

References

800 metres at the European Athletics Indoor Championships
800
Euro